The 1979 Utah State Aggies football team represented Utah State University during the 1979 NCAA Division I-A football season as a member of the Pacific Coast Athletic Association (PCAA). The Aggies were led by fourth-year head coach Bruce Snyder and played their home games at Romney Stadium in Logan, Utah. They finished the season with a record of seven wins, three losses and one tie (7–3–1, 4–0–1 PCAA).

Schedule

Roster

References

Utah State
Utah State Aggies football seasons
Big West Conference football champion seasons
Utah State Aggies football